Mojo Box is an album by Southern Culture on the Skids. It was released on January 27, 2004, via Yep Roc Records. It was recorded at the band's Kudzu Ranch studio.

Track listing
 "Smiley Yeah Yeah Yeah" 
 "Mojo Box" 
 "Doublewide" 
 "I Want a Love" 
 "'69 El Camino" 
 "The Wet Spot" 
 "Soulful Garage" 
 "Biff Bang Pow" 
 "Where Is The Moon" 
 "Fire of Love" 
 "Swamp Fox" 
 "The Sweet Spot" 
 "It's All Over But The Shoutin'"
 "John Harris Is a Rock God'"

References

Southern Culture on the Skids albums
2004 albums
Yep Roc Records albums